Edward Richard Enfield (3 September 1929 – 21 February 2019) was an English television and radio presenter and newspaper journalist. He was also the father of comedian Harry Enfield and novelist Lizzie Enfield.

Biography

The son of Sir Ralph Roscoe Enfield, a senior civil servant in the Ministry of Agriculture (a descendant of the nineteenth-century philanthropist Edward Enfield), and Doris Edith ( Hussey), a Girton College, Cambridge-educated writer,
 Edward Enfield was born on 3 September 1929 in Hampstead, London.

He was educated at Ashbury College in Ottawa, Ontario, Canada, Westminster School, London, and University College, Oxford. He had various jobs in industry, including with Cathay Pacific, until joining the education department of West Sussex County Council, where he became Assistant Director of Education. After overseeing the privatisation of school meals and cleaning services, he took early retirement and went on to present a radio travel programme from Ireland in 1994. He then appeared on BBC television with Anne Robinson on the consumer programme Watchdog and became a regular reporter on the show. He also appeared on Points of View, the Heaven and Earth Show, Through the Keyhole, daytime shows such as Richard & Judy and various holiday programmes.

Other radio programmes have included; Double Vision with Miles Kington, Free Spirits and Enfield Pedals after Byron in which he cycled through Greece, following in the footsteps of Lord Byron.

For some years he wrote a regular column in The Oldie, and wrote many articles for national newspapers; he also wrote several books, including 'Downhill All the Way', 'Greece on my Wheels' and 'Freewheeling through Ireland'.

In 1956, Enfield married Deirdre Jenkins; they had a son, the comedian Harry Enfield, and three daughters, one of whom is the novelist Lizzie Enfield.

He died on 21 February 2019 at the age of 89.

Work

Prose
 Enfield, Edward (1994). Downhill all the way. London: Bloomsbury.
 Enfield, Edward (2003). Greece on my wheels. Chichester: Summersdale.
 Enfield, Edward (2006). Freewheeling through Ireland. Chichester: Summersdale. The first part of this book documents Enfield's observations during a two week solo cycling holiday in the west of Ireland in 1992, arriving by ferry into Cork and then cycling via Macroom, Killarney, Tralee, Listowel, Tarbert, Cliffs of Moher, Galway, Inishmore, Leenane, and Cong, before returning to Dublin (from Galway) by train. The second part of the book documents a subsequent month-long visit to Ireland two years later, in June 1994, arriving by airplane into Shannon Airport and then cycling solo through Counties Clare, Galway, Mayo, Sligo, and Donegal before transferring by bus from Letterkenny to Dublin. After a few days in Dublin he again transferred by bus to Tralee via Limerick and proceeded to cycle around the Dingle Peninsula. Now behind schedule, he decided to abandon his plan to cycle the Ring of Kerry and instead cycled via Kenmare to Glengarriff for a couple of nights, and from there via Skibbereen to Union Hall. From there he cycled on to Cork City. Finally he transferred by train to Limerick before flying out from nearby Shannon Airport. Several detailed enlightened accounts of Ireland's history are included. He stayed at Bed & Breakfasts throughout both visits, endeavouring to experience Irish hospitality amongst everyday people. 
 Enfield, Edward (2008). Dawdling By The Danube. Chichester: Summersdale.

References

External links

The Oldie Magazine

1929 births
2019 deaths
English expatriates in Canada
English television presenters
English radio personalities
Alumni of University College, Oxford
People educated at Westminster School, London